Puñal is a city in Santiago Province. Puñal became a rural section of the municipality of Santiago de los Caballeros in 1937, comprising the spots:  Guayabal, Matanzas and Laguna Prieta. In February 2006 the rural section of Puñal was raised to the category of municipality. Puñal comprises the municipal districts Guayabal, Canabacoa, Arenoso, La Javilla and Matanzas.

Sources 
 – World-Gazetteer.com
http://www.fallingrain.com/world/DR/25/Punal_Adentro.html
https://web.archive.org/web/20081026081842/http://www.wikidominicana.edu.do/wiki/Municipio_Pu%C3%B1al

Populated places in Santiago Province (Dominican Republic)
Municipalities of the Dominican Republic